Record Breaker is the eighteenth stand-up comedy special by stand-up comedian Kathy Griffin on Bravo and her twentieth overall.

Track listing

Personnel

Technical and production
Deborah Adamson - associate producer
Kathy Griffin - executive producer
Paul Miller - executive producer
Kimber Rickabaugh - executive producer
Jeff U'ren - film editor
Bruce Ryan - production design
Cisco Henson - executive in charge of production
Lesley Maynard - associate director, stage manager
David Crivelli - technical supervisor

Visuals and imagery
Ashlee Mullen - makeup artist
Charles Baker Strahan - hair stylist
Alan Adelman - lighting designer

References

External links
Kathy Griffin's Official Website

Kathy Griffin albums
Stand-up comedy albums
2013 live albums